"Nothingburger" (also spelled as Nothing-burger or Nothing burger), is a term used to describe a situation that receives a lot of attention, but which, upon closer examination, would reveal to be of little to no real significance.

The phrase refers to the notion that a regular hamburger is supposed to have numerous different flavorful and colorful ingredients and taste, but if the meat or 'burger' portion were to be removed, all that would be left would be a 'Nothingburger', thus many colorful or interesting things might be on the outside, but upon further inspection on the inside, "nothing" remains.

History
The term "Nothingburger" was first coined in the 1950s by Hollywood gossip columnist Louella Parsons, and has a history of use in American political circles, especially within the Washington D.C. beltway. The term reached its peak usage, especially among United States poltical circles in the late 2010s. In 2017, United States Senator Ted Cruz used the word in response to questions around then United States Attorney General Jeff Sessions, Cruz said: "The underlying meeting is a nothingburger. It’s what senators do every day, meeting with foreign ambassadors. That’s part of the job."

As of 2023, the Merriam-Webster dictionary has not yet included Nothingburger as a valid word to be defined in its dictionaries, but has a page dedicated to monitoring the word and is considering the word for inclusion potentially in the future. Other dictionaries, such as the Oxford English Dictionary were reported by the BBC to have added Nothingburger as a valid word to their dictionary as recently as 2018. The Oxford English Dictionary defined the word as, "Nothingburger is a way of describing someone or something seen to have little importance."

Spelling variations also exist, with no apparent consensus regarding spelling. All variants, including: "Nothingburger", "nothingburger", "Nothing Burger", "Nothing burger", "nothing burger", or the hyphenated "Nothing-burger" have appeared in press and in social media usage by popular and political figures.

See also
 Anne Burford
 Ted Cruz
 Van Jones

References 

1950s slang
1980s slang
2010s slang
2020s slang
1950s neologisms
1980s neologisms
2010s neologisms
2020s neologisms